Cynodraco, also spelled Cynodracon or Cynodrakon, is a dubious genus of non-mammalian therapsid, probably gorgonopsian, from the late Permian of South Africa. Two species of the genus have been named, Cynodraco serridens and Cynodraco major. Its fossils have been found in the Cistecephalus Assemblage Zone, which dates to the Wuchiapingian age of the late Permian. 
Cynodraco was one of the first gorgonopsian taxa named, alongside Gorgonops and Lycosaurus, which were named in the same publication.

History of discovery
Fossils of Cynodraco were discovered in the Karoo of South Africa by Andrew Geddes Bain, who gave them to the British Museum in 1853. Richard Owen described Cynodraco on the basis of these fossils in 1876 and classified them in two species: Cynodraco serridens and Cynodraco major. In one of his two 1876 papers on the genus, he spells it Cynodraco; in the other, he spells it Cynodracon. Owen found the mammalian characters of the humerus of Cynodraco and the similarity of its teeth to those of the saber-toothed cat Machairodus to be remarkable. Seeley later noted that the humerus could not be proved to belong to the same species as the skull fragments on which the genus is based. In 1890, Richard Lydekker regarded C. serridens as the type species of the genus and synonymized C. major with it. Denise Sigogneau-Russell regarded Cynodraco as a possible gorgonopsian of uncertain affinity, an identification which remains accepted.

Footnotes

References

Bibliography

 
 
 
 
 
 
 
 

Prehistoric therapsid genera
Permian synapsids of Africa
Lopingian synapsids of Africa
Fossil taxa described in 1876
Taxa named by Richard Owen